Brastiņš is a Latvian surname.

Notable people with the surname include:
Arvīds Brastiņš (1893–1984), Latvian sculptor, writer and neopagan leader
Ernests Brastiņš (1892–1942), Latvian artist, amateur historian, folklorist and neopagan leader

Latvian-language masculine surnames